Cervenia is a commune in the southern part of Teleorman County, Muntenia, Romania, on the left (east) bank of the river Vedea, 22 km southeast from Alexandria. It is composed of a single village, Cervenia.

References

Communes in Teleorman County
Localities in Muntenia